Cacho Island, Snow Island
 Calliope Beach, Snow Island
 Camp Academia, Livingston Island 
 Canetti Peak, Livingston Island 
 Casanovas Peak, Livingston Island 
 Castellvi Peak, Livingston Island 
 Castra Martis Hill, Livingston Island 
 Castro Peak, Livingston Island 
 Catalunyan Saddle, Livingston Island
 Cavarus Point, Oscar II Coast
 Chakarov Island, Biscoe Islands
 Chakarov Peak, Oscar II Coast
 Chapanov Peak, Oscar II Coast
 Chargan Ridge, Graham Coast
 Charrúa Gap, Livingston Island  
 Chavdar Peninsula, Graham Land 
 Chavei Cove, Livingston Island 
 Chayka Passage, Trinity Island
 Chelopech Hill, Trinity Peninsula  
 Chemish Ridge, Foyn Coast 
 Chepelare Peak, Livingston Island  
 Chepino Saddle, Sentinel Range
 Chepra Cove, Graham Coast  
 Cherepish Ridge, Livingston Island
 Cherkovna Point, Graham Coast
 Chernomen Glacier, Graham Coast 
 Chernoochene Glacier, Oscar II Coast 
 Chernopeev Peak, Trinity Peninsula
 Chertigrad Point, Loubet Coast
 Cherven Peak, Rugged Island
 Chichil Point, Clarence Island  
 Chintulov Ridge, Oscar II Coast
 Chipev Nunatak, Nordenskjöld Coast  
 Chiprovtsi Point, Rugged Island  
 Chiren Heights, Graham Coast  
 Chirpan Peak, Livingston Island  
 Chochoveni Nunatak, Trinity Peninsula 
 Chorobates Rock, Nelson Island
 Chorul Peninsula, Graham Coast 
 Christoff Cliff, Livingston Island  
 Chubra Peak, Davis Coast
 Chuchuliga Glacier, Oscar II Coast  
 Chudomir Cove, Trinity Peninsula 
 Chukovezer Island, Anvers Island 
 Chumerna Glacier, Brabant Island  
 Chuprene Glacier, Smith Island 
 Churicheni Island, Robert Island
 Chuypetlovo Knoll, Foyn Coast
 Clio Bay, Lavoisier Island
 Coburg Peak, Trinity Peninsula
 Cosmolabe Rock, Nelson Island
 Crates Bay, Graham Coast

See also 
 Bulgarian toponyms in Antarctica

External links 
 Bulgarian Antarctic Gazetteer
 SCAR Composite Gazetteer of Antarctica
 Antarctic Digital Database (ADD). Scale 1:250000 topographic map of Antarctica with place-name search.
 L. Ivanov. Bulgarian toponymic presence in Antarctica. Polar Week at the National Museum of Natural History in Sofia, 2–6 December 2019

Bibliography 
 J. Stewart. Antarctica: An Encyclopedia. Jefferson, N.C. and London: McFarland, 2011. 1771 pp.  
 L. Ivanov. Bulgarian Names in Antarctica. Sofia: Manfred Wörner Foundation, 2021. Second edition. 539 pp.  (in Bulgarian)
 G. Bakardzhieva. Bulgarian toponyms in Antarctica. Paisiy Hilendarski University of Plovdiv: Research Papers. Vol. 56, Book 1, Part A, 2018 – Languages and Literature, pp. 104-119 (in Bulgarian)
 L. Ivanov and N. Ivanova. Bulgarian names. In: The World of Antarctica. Generis Publishing, 2022. pp. 114-115. 

Antarctica
 
Bulgarian toponyms in Antarctica
Names of places in Antarctica